Megamall, Mega Mall, or Mega mall may refer to:

 A very large shopping mall worldwide, in Asia Pacific defined as one with over 1.5 million sq. ft. of net leasable area

Shopping centers with "mega" in the name
 MEGA Family Shopping Centre, a chain of shopping centers anchored by IKEA stores, across Russia
 Mega Mall (Bucharest), Romania
 Mega Mall (Sofia), Bulgaria
 Mid Valley Megamall, Kuala Lumpur, Malaysia
 SM Megamall, Manila, Philippines

Other large shopping centers
 American Dream Meadowlands, New Jersey, USA
 Mall of America, Minnesota, USA
 West Edmonton Mall, Edmonton, Alberta, Canada

Other

Mega Mall Story, a simulation game
 Megamall (film), a 2009 documentary on the controversial Palisades Center, New York